Coțușca is a commune in Botoșani County, Western Moldavia, Romania. It is composed of nine villages: Avram Iancu, Cotu Miculinți, Coțușca, Crasnaleuca, Ghireni, Mihail Kogălniceanu, Nichiteni, Nicolae Bălcescu and Puțureni.

Demographics 
According to the census from 2002 there was a total population of 5,357 people living in this commune. Of this population, 99.94% are ethnic Romanians,  0.03% ethnic Hungarians and 0.01% ethnic Ukrainians.

Natives
 Victor Găureanu
 Constantin Simirad

References

Communes in Botoșani County
Localities in Western Moldavia
Populated places on the Prut